VGLM may refer to:
 Lalmonirhat Airport (ICAO airport code)
 Vector generalized linear model